Khinganornis (after the Greater Khingan mountain range) is a genus of ornithuromorph bird from the Early Cretaceous Longjiang Formation of Liaoning, China. The genus contains a single species, Khinganornis hulunbuirensis, known from a nearly complete fossil preserved on a slab and counter slab. The holotype most likely represents an adult individual.

References 

Birds described in 2020
Fossil taxa described in 2020
Extinct birds of Asia
Prehistoric bird genera
Mesozoic birds of Asia
Prehistoric euornitheans